Mykola Konrad was a Ukrainian Greek Catholic priest who became a martyr in 1941.

Biography

Konrad was born on 16 May 1876 in the village of Strusiv in Ternopil Region.  He studied philosophy and theology in Rome, where he defended his dissertation and received his doctorate.  He was ordained a priest in 1899. He taught for a time in high schools in Berezhany and Terebovlya. In 1929 he founded Obnova ("Renewal") the first communion of Ukrainian Catholic students, and in 1930 he was asked by Metropolitan Andriy Sheptytsky to teach at the Lviv Theological Academy.  He was then appointed parish priest in the village of Stradch.

On 26 June 1941 he was murdered along with Volodymyr Pryjma, in a forest near Stradch as they were returning from the house of a sick woman who had requested the sacrament of reconciliation.

He was beatified by Pope John Paul II on 27 June 2001.

Influence 
In an interview, Mykola Markevych said, "Doctor Konrad, a professor at the Academy, my catechist... O, he was a distinguished person. An ideal man. He was very involved with youth; he had a heart for youth- and for his people. He wanted  us to be patriots, good and aware students. That was Father Konrad."

See also

References 

1876 births
1941 deaths
People from Ternopil Oblast
People from the Kingdom of Galicia and Lodomeria
Ukrainian Austro-Hungarians
Members of the Ukrainian Greek Catholic Church
Ukrainian beatified people
Ukrainian people executed by the Soviet Union
Catholic people executed by the Soviet Union
Beatifications by Pope John Paul II